Platero and I, also translated as Platero and Me, is a 1914 Spanish prose poem written by Juan Ramón Jiménez. The book is one of the most popular works by Jiménez, and unfolds around a writer and his eponymous donkey, Platero ("silvery"). Platero is described as a "small donkey, a soft, hairy donkey: so soft to the touch that he might be said to be made of cotton, with no bones. Only the jet mirrors of his eyes are hard like two black crystal scarabs."

Platero remains a symbol of tenderness, purity and naiveté, and is used by the author as a means of reflection about the simple joys of life, memories, and various characters and their ways of life.

Plot 
Platero is a silver-colored donkey ("plata" means silver in Spanish) who throughout the years is seemingly the only constant friend and companion of the author, who makes observations to and confides in him. The author believes that Platero understands everything, except for the language of humans, just as humans do not know the language of animals, but he gives his master joy and sincere warmth.

Adaptations 

In 1960, the Italian composer Mario Castelnuovo-Tedesco composed a suite of music for guitar with narrator based on the stories in the book. In 1968, the Spanish film director Alfredo Castellón adapted the book into a movie by the same title.  The guitarist and composer Eduardo Sainz de la Maza also wrote a suite of eight pieces for guitar based on Platero Y Yo, which bears the same title.

A theatrical adaptation has been written by Josep-Antoni Garí, published in the literary magazine Ex Tempore and presented at the literary evening of the Circle of Writers of the United Nations, in Geneva, on January 20, 2017, thus commemorating the centenary of the work.

References

External links 

 'EntreRíos' dedica su último número a Juan Ramón Jiménez
"Platero y yo" at Proyecto Gutenberg

1914 novels
1914 poems
Spanish novels
Novels by Juan Ramón Jiménez
Novels set in Andalusia
Novels set in Spain